Marshmallow Coast (formerly M Coast) is an indie pop band associated with the Elephant Six Collective.

Background
Marshmallow Coast began in 1996, with a self released cassette recorded by singer/songwriter Andy Gonzales, which featured contributions from Joel Richardson. Gonzales then recorded Timesquare with Julian Koster in 1997, although it was not released until 2000 due to various label disputes.

Gonzales dropped the project briefly to tour with the Music Tapes, and relocated to Athens, GA in 1998.  In Athens, Gonzales met Kevin Barnes and Derek Almstead.  With Barnes, Gonzales recorded Marshmallow Coast's debut LP Seniors & Juniors, released in 1999. Gonzales joined of Montreal that same year.

The next two albums, Marshmallow Coasting and Ride the Lightning were produced by Almstead. Gonzales then recorded Antistar with Sarah KirkPatrick, which was produced by Jason NeSmith and released in 2003.

In 2005, Gonzales announced the project would show same changes as Almstead began to contribute to songwriting. Emily Growden and Carlton Owens joined the group, and the name was changed to M Coast. A new album entitled Say It in Slang was released on HHBTM Records in 2006. 
In November 2007, it was announced the group had parted ways. Gonzales reverted the name back to Marshmallow Coast.

Marshmallow Coast returned in 2009 with the release of Phreak Phantasy on HHBTM.

Seniors and Juniors Strikes Back was released on HHBTM in March 2011. The album is a re-recording of the group's 1999 album, Seniors and Juniors, with the addition of a few new tracks.

Discography

Albums
 Seniors & Juniors (CD) - Kindercore Records - 1999
 Timesquare (CD) - Spare Me Records - 2000
 Seniors & Juniors (CD/LP) - Pickled Egg Records - 2000
 Marshmallow Coasting (CD) - Kindercore Records - 2000
 Ride the Lightning (CD) - Quattro/Misra Records/Pickled Egg Records - 2001
 AntiStar  (CD) - Misra Records - 2003
Bizarre Classical Volume 1 (CD-R) - Self Released - 2006
 Say It in Slang (CD) - Happy Happy Birthday to Me - 2006
 Phreak Phantasy (CD) - Happy Happy Birthday to Me - 2009
 Seniors and Juniors Strikes Back (CD) - Happy Happy Birthday to Me - 2011
 Vangelis Rides Again (CD) - Happy Happy Birthday to Me - 2015
Memory Girl (LP) - Happy Happy Birthday to Me - 2018

Singles and EPs
 Marshmallow Coast (cassette) - Fuzzy Aloof - 1996
 "I'm a Big Kid Now" (split single w/Midget and Hairs) (7") - Fuzzy Aloof - 1996
 "Scent of Credibility" (7") Spare Me Records/Fuzzy Aloof - 1997
 Happy Happy Birthday to Me singles club: October (7") - HHBTM - 1999
 Kindercore singles club: January (split single w/My First Keyboard) (7") Kindercore Records - 2000
 "Archibald Of The Balding Sparrows" (split w/Of Montreal) (7") Kindercore Records - 2000

References

The Elephant 6 Recording Company artists
American indie pop groups
Misra Records artists